Pachmarhi is a hill station in Hoshangabad district of Madhya Pradesh state of central India. It has been the location of a cantonment (Pachmarhi Cantonment) since British Raj. 

It is widely known as Satpura ki Rani ("Queen of Satpura"), situated at a height of 1067 m in a valley of the Satpura Range in Narmadapuram district. Dhupgarh, the highest point (1,352 m) in Madhya Pradesh and the Satpura range, is located here. It is a part of the Satpura Biosphere Reserve. It is also famous for Satpura Tiger Reserve, Satpura National Park, Lord Shiva, Pandavas of Mahabharata.

History
The name Pachmarhi is believed to be derived from the Hindi words Panch ("five") and Marhi ("caves"). According to a legend, these caves were built by five Pandava brothers of Mahabharatha era during their thirteen years of exile. The caves are situated on a hilltop and provide an excellent vantage point.

Pachmadhi region was Ruled by Bhonsale Kings।. It came under Marathas in the 18th century under SenaSahebSubha Maharaj Raghuji Raje Bhonsale।.

Before the British, the Pachmarhi region was under the kingdom of the Gond Bhagvat Singh, although it was not a populated village or town at that time. Captain James Forsyth of the British Army along with Subhedar Major Nathoo Ramji Powar, who was later made the Kotwal (in charge of the armoury) of Pachmarhi, spotted the plateau in the Pachmarhi region in 1857 while leading his troops on the way to Jhansi. It quickly developed into hill station and sanatorium for British troops in the Central Provinces of India.

The population in 1901 was 3,020, rising to double that number in the hot summer months. Pachmarhi also served as the summer capital for the Central Provinces.

The forest around the town is home to many rare varieties of plants. UNESCO added Pachmarhi park to its list of Biosphere Reserves in May 2009.

The total area of Pachmarhi Biosphere Reserve is 4981.72 km2. It is located at longitude 22° 11’ to 22° 50’N and latitude 77° 47’ to 78° 52’E. It covers parts of three civil districts, viz; Hoshanga bad (59.55%), Chhindwara (29.19%) and Betul (11.26%). It includes three wildlife conservation units viz., Bori Sanctuary 485.72 km2), Satpura National Park (524.37 km2) and Pachmarhi Sanctuary (491.63 km2).

Town
The town is not very large, and most of its area is under the administration of the Pachmarhi Cantonment Board, serving the Indian Army. It is the center of the Army Education Corps (AEC). The population of Pachmarhi is about 12,062 as per the report released by Census India 2011, most of whom are connected with the Army installations, tourism, and forest department.

An airstrip is situated on the way to Dhupgarh. It is overrun with grass and is seldom used. Tigers and bison are known to have been sighted nearby. A helipad is also present near the airstrip. Leopard sightings are also common along the edge of the Pachmarhi Cantonment.

Climate
The climate is mild, with temperatures ranging from warm to cool. Summers have significantly more rainfall than winters. Köppen and Geiger classify this location as Cwa. The average temperature in this area is 21.7 °C. The average rainfall in this area is 2012 mm. May is the hottest month of the year, with an average temperature of 30.3 °C. December is the coldest month of the year, with an average temperature of 15.5 °C.

Tourism

 

Pachmarhi is a tourist retreat. Tourists visit Pachmarhi throughout the year. There are numerous hotels, most of which are located near the market. Only a few cottages, resorts, and MP tourism hotels are located in the Pachmarhi area, about 2 to 3 kilometres from the bus stop.

Pachmarhi's forests are home to numerous cave paintings, some of which are estimated to be 10,000 years old. The garden at the base of Pandava Caves, a tourist attraction, is depicted in the photograph. Although the caves are Buddhist in nature, the name has stuck. The area has abundant timber reserves, including teak, but due to its status as a reserve, no new construction or tree felling is permitted. Pachmarhi, which has a diverse and rare flora and fauna, requires central and state government approval for any new construction outside of the town limits.

Some of the places of tourist interest there are:

Rajat Prapat (large waterfall)
Bee Fall
Bada Mahadev
Gupt Mahadev
Chauragarh (Shiv devotees come here in huge numbers during Mahashivratri)
Dhupgarh (the highest peak of the Satpuras and Madhya Pradesh)
Handi Khoh (deep valley)
Apsara Falls (fairy pool)
Jatashankar (stalagmite-filled cave in a deep ravine)
Dutchess Fall
Pachmarhi Hill (whole view of Pachmarhi City)
Pansy Pool
Waters Meet
Picadilly Circus
Patharchatta
Crumps Crag
Lady Robertson's View
Colletin Crag
Mount Rosa
Reechgarh
Rajendra Giri (gardens with natural scenery)
Bansri Vihar
Little Fall
Naagdwari
Draupadi Kund
Twynham Pool
Chhota Mahadev
Nandigad

Pachmarhi offers a variety of natural attractions such as lake boating, paragliding, greenery, views, waterfalls, mountain streams, and wildlife. Pachmarhi is also home to the National Adventure Institute, which hosts a variety of adventure training camps. Bharat Scout & Guides is also located there.

Wildlife
In the Satpura Tiger Reserve, large mammal species include tiger, leopard, wild boar, gaur (Bos gaurus), chital deer (Axis axis), muntjac deer, sambar deer (Cervus unicolor), and rhesus macaques.

The endemic fauna includes chinkara, nilgai, wild dogs, the Indian wolf, bison, Indian giant squirrels, and flying squirrels.

Biosphere
The forests of Pachmarhi, especially in the summer, are densely forested with fruit trees such as mangoes, jamun, custard fruit, and lesser-known but delicious local fruits such as khatua, tendu, chunna, khinni, and chaar. Oak and blue pine are also abundant. The forest is also known for its abundance of medicinal plants and herbs.

Dhupgarh
The Satpura Range's highest point is 1,352 m. It's well-known for its sunrise and sunset views. At night, one can see the lights of neighbouring towns such as Itarsi. During the day, the lush green valley provides a captivating view. The summit can be reached by road or by foot.

Chauragarh

This is the third highest peak in the Satpura ranges. It is a pilgrimage site with Lord Siva's temple at the top. The Chauragarh fort there was built by king Sangram Shah of the Gond dynasty. It was developed by SenaSahebSubha Janoji Maharaj of Nagpur। from the Maratha Era the Pilgrimage from Nagpur Start।. It is also a widely known spot for sunrise viewing. During the festivities of Nagpanchami and Mahashivratri, devotees flock to Chauragarh temple in large numbers, leaving about 2 lakh trishuls as offerings which are kept in front of the temple and also in the way of the temple.

Bee Hill and Bee Falls
This is a waterfall in Pachmarhi. It is so named because from a distance the waterfall sounds like a bee. Bee Falls takes its name from bees since this place is famous for honey bees.

Dutchess Fall 
This waterfall is the most remote. There are Doctor Fish in the pool made by the waterfall. The road to this waterfall is extreme, with very steep inclinations. There is straight downward trekking of 1 km.

PanarPani
Panarpani has a natural freshwater lake with forest around.

Sangam
This is a conflux of mountain streams behind Dhupgarh. The water in these streams is crystal clear in all seasons except of course autumn.

Jatashankar and Mahadev caves
These are mountain caves with fresh water dripping from them. One can witness ecosystem at work out here with mountains feeding the streams with fresh water, the water that they soak-in during autumn. As the name suggests, these caves and many others are the abode of lord Siva.

Silver Falls
Also called Rajat Prapat/Big Fall. The falls drop over 2800 feet through the gorge, leaving a silver streak behind that gives its name .

Apsara Vihar

This is a mountain stream that creates a natural water pool, cascades and waterfall in its course.

Other waterfalls

Pachmarhi's ecosystem includes other waterfalls such as Little Fall.

New year event in Pachmarhi utsav

Every year from 25 to 31 December, Pachmarhi utsav is organized by govt. Of Mp. In which various celebrities have been called to perform stage shows at utsav ground and various places. At the end of 31 an event is organized by local association Pachmarhi Partyan Mitra and MARRS

Film location 
Massey Sahib (film 1985), featuring Raghuvir Yadav, Barry John, Arundhati Roy
Thodasa Roomani Ho Jaayen (film 1990), featuring Nana Patekar, Anita Kanwar
Tarkieb (film 2000), featuring Nana Patekar, Tabbu, Raghuveer Yadav, Shilpa Shetty, Milind Soman
Aśoka (film 2001), featuring Shah Rukh Khan, Kareena Kapoor Khan
Chakravyuh(film 2012), featuring Arjun Rampal, Abhay Deol, Manoj Bajpai, Om Puri, Esha Gupta
Trinetra (1991 film), featuring Mithun Chakraborty , Amrish Puri

Access
Pachmarhi is well connected from Narmadapuram, Bhopal, Itarsi, Chhindwara, Gadarwara, Narsinghpur, Indore, Jabalpur. Buses start from Rani Kamalapati ISBT of Bhopal and generally take close to 5–6 hours. From Indore it takes 10–11 hours via Bhopal to reach Pachmarhi. The buses move through different towns like Narmadapuram, Chhindwara, Makhan Nagar, Sohagpur and Pipariya. The road's name is State Highway 19, and its name changes to State Highway 19A from the village of Matkuli to Pachmarhi. Matkuli is trijunction of Pipariya-Chhindwara-Pachmarhi way, and Pachmarhi is nearest from here, about 28 km. Pipariya is the nearest railhead, many trains on Mumbai-Kolkata route stop at Pipariya.. Itarsi Junction is also a major railhead near Pachmari. Madhya Pradesh Tourism Development Corporation buses are available for Pachmarhi from Indore, Bhopal. These buses are air-conditioned.

Transport
The nearest airport is Bhopal.
The nearest railway station is Pipariya.

References

External links

 Pachmarhi Travel Company
 
 About Pachmarhi and its History

 
Hill stations in Madhya Pradesh
Cantonments of India
Biosphere reserves of India
Cantonments of British India
Tourism in Madhya Pradesh